Patchewollock is a town in north-west Victoria, Australia. At the 2016 census, Patchewollock had a population of 133.

The name Patchewollock originated from two Aboriginal words: putje, plenty, and wallah, porcupine grass. The town was first established after the First World War, when soldier settlement blocks were appearing in the area. A post office (originally a receiving office) opened on 27 July 1920.

Previous localities of Baring  with a post office open from 1926 to 1948, and Dering  with a post office open from 1923 to 1949, lie within that part of the Patchewollock locality in the Rural City of Mildura.

, the township maintained a pub and a post office.

History
Patchewollock is a rural township located within the traditional lands of the Wergaia tribes, whose Aboriginal expression literally means the "place of the plenty porcupine grass". By the end of World War I, the town was came into its foundation as a soldier settlement.

The town's most notable feature is a giant mural silo portrait, which depicts the life of grazier and grain farmer, Nick "Noodle" Hulland, painted in 2016 by street artist Fintan Magee.

In 2021, Patchewollock had 80 dwellings and a population of 149 people.

References

External links

Towns in Victoria (Australia)
Mallee (Victoria)
Australian soldier settlements
1920 establishments in Australia